The Queen's Park Hippodrome was a theatre in Harpurhey, Manchester, England. It was built on the site of an old tramshed and opened on 25 April 1904. It initially staged variety, dramas, pantomimes, and revues, which gave way to "sizzlingly saucy" French variety acts towards the end of the theatre's life.

Like many other theatres of the period, the increasing competition from cinema resulted in its closure in 1952, and the building was eventually demolished in 1966.

The theatre was part of the Broadhead Circuit of 17 theatres at its peak, which had its head quarters at Hulme Hippodrome.

References

Citations

Bibliography

Theatres in Manchester
1904 establishments in England
Buildings and structures demolished in 1966